The 1984 Bristol City Council election took place on 3 May 1984 to elect members of Bristol City Council in England. This was on the same day as other local elections. In this election, one-third of seats were up for election. There was a general but small swing from Conservative to Labour. Labour regained their position as the largest party and took minority control of the Council.

Ward results

The change is calculated using the 1983 election results.

Avonmouth

Bishopston

Bishopsworth

Brislington East

Brislington West

Clifton

Cotham

Hartcliffe

Henbury

Hengrove

Henleaze

Horfield

Kingsweston

Knowle

Redland

St George East

St George West

Southmead

Stockwood

Stoke Bishop

Westbury-on-Trym

Whitchurch Park

Windmill Hill

Sources
 Bristol Evening Post 6 May 1984

1984
1984 English local elections
1980s in Bristol
May 1984 events in the United Kingdom